Chirakhlu, is an abandoned village in the Vayots Dzor Province of Armenia.

See also
 Vayots Dzor Province

References 

Ghost towns in Europe